= Copeland's Cure =

2005 book

- Author: Natalie Robins
- Subject: History of medicine
- Published: 2005 (Knopf)
- Pages: 352
- ISBN: 0-375-41090-2

Copeland's Cure is a book-length history of the rivalry between mainstream medicine and homeopathy written by Natalie Robins and published by Knopf in 2005.
